Yokohama Dreamland was an amusement park that operated in Totsuka, Yokohama, Japan from 1964 to 2002. The management company, Japan Dream Tourism, was acquired by the supermarket chain Daiei in 1993, and the amusement park closed permanently on February 17, 2002, due to financial issues. It was the sister park to Nara Dreamland, which itself closed permanently in 2006.

Beginning in May 1966, the park was served by the Yokohama Dreamland Monorail from Ōfuna Station. In September 1967, however, service on the line was suspended, due to structural issues resulting from engineering problems encountered in its construction. The closure was expected to be temporary, but a protracted legal battle over responsibility for the monorail's problems ensued, during which its infrastructure deteriorated significantly. After subsequent failed attempts to resurrect the line, it finally began to be demolished in 2003.

In 2005, the Ministry of Education, Culture, Sports, Science and Technology allowed the newly established Yokohama College of Pharmacy to occupy the site of the former amusement park. This involved converting the former Hotel Empire building and nearby existing structures into an academic library, classrooms and labs respectively, with additional structures, amenities and green spaces added later on.

Data
 Opening hours: 10:00-17:00 (March to November), 10:00-16:00 (January, February and December)
 Entrance fee: ¥800 (adults), ¥400 (children)
 Mascots: Dori-chan, Ran-chan

References

External links
Yokohama Dreamland Mirror of official site (Japanese)
Photos of Yokohama Dreamland
Rollercoaster Database - Yokohama Dreamland

1964 establishments in Japan
2002 disestablishments in Japan
Defunct amusement parks in Japan
Buildings and structures in Yokohama
Amusement parks opened in 1964
Amusement parks closed in 2002